The List of shipwrecks in 1758 includes some ships sunk, wrecked or otherwise lost during 1758.

January

14 January

19 January

26 January

Unknown date

February

16 February

18 February

Unknown date

March

7 March

10 March

27 March

Unknown date

April

13 April

14 April

15 April

28 April

29 April

Unknown date

May

12 May

Unknown date

June

13 June

Unknown date

July

2 July

6 July

11 July

21 July

Unknown date

August

5 August

20 August

23 August

Unknown date

September

6 September

16 September

19 September

Unknown date

October

19 October

23 October

Unknown date

November

1 November

8 November

19 November

20 November

28 November

Unknown date

December

11 December

12 December

13 December

16 December

Unknown date

Unknown date

References

1758